In enzymology, a ribosomal-protein-alanine N-acetyltransferase is an enzyme that catalyzes the chemical reaction

acetyl-CoA + ribosomal-protein L-alanine  CoA + ribosomal-protein N-acetyl-L-alanine

Thus, the two substrates of this enzyme are acetyl-CoA and ribosomal-protein L-alanine, whereas its two products are CoA and ribosomal-protein N-acetyl-L-alanine.

This enzyme belongs to the family of transferases, specifically those acyltransferases transferring groups other than aminoacyl groups.  The systematic name of this enzyme class is acetyl-CoA:ribosomal-protein-L-alanine N-acetyltransferase. This enzyme is also called ribosomal protein S18 acetyltransferase.

Structural studies

References

 

EC 2.3.1
Enzymes of known structure